Hubert Buydens (born 4 January 1982) is a Canadian rugby union player. He is a member of the Canada national side and was part of Canada's squad at the 2011 Rugby World Cup where he made 4 appearances. He plays as a prop forward and made his Canada debut in 2006 against England Saxons and currently holds 50 caps in total.

Born in Saskatoon, Saskatchewan, Canada, Buydens previously played his club rugby with the Castaway Wanderers RFC in the British Columbia Premiership and with the Prairie Wolf Pack in the Canadian Rugby Championship. He also played Canadian football at the University of Saskatchewan and was drafted by the BC Lions in the sixth round of 2008 CFL Draft; he attended training camp with the Lions but chose not to play Canadian football professionally.

Buydens currently plays for the New Orleans Gold in Major League Rugby.

References

1982 births
Living people
Canada international rugby union players
Canadian expatriate rugby union players
Canadian expatriate sportspeople in the United States
Expatriate rugby union players in the United States
Manawatu rugby union players
New Orleans Gold players
Prairie Wolf Pack players
San Diego Breakers players
Saskatchewan Huskies football players
Sportspeople from Saskatoon
Canadian football offensive linemen
Rugby union props